Qusum County, is a county under the administration of the prefecture-level city of Shannan in the Tibet Autonomous Region.

In 1999 the county had a population of 15,541 inhabitants. The capital is Qusum.

Counties of Tibet
Shannan, Tibet